Bernardo Zanne or Bernardo Zanni (born in 1450) was an Italian clergyman and bishop for the Roman Catholic Archdiocese of Split-Makarska. He was ordained in 1498. He was appointed bishop in 1503. He died in 1524.

References 

1450 births
1524 deaths
Italian Roman Catholic bishops
Bishops of Split